Kurt Huang is co-founder, president, and chief product officer of BitPass.  He has a Computer Science degree from Harvard and an MD from Stanford.

Named to the 2004 list of the world's 100 Top Young Innovators by MIT's Technology Review magazine.

He was born in Chicago to immigrants from Taiwan.

References

Living people
American computer businesspeople
American people of Chinese descent
American people of Taiwanese descent
Harvard University alumni
Stanford University School of Medicine alumni
Year of birth missing (living people)